Mulroy Island is a small island which lies just off Black Crag, the northeast extremity of Noville Peninsula, Thurston Island. Discovered by the U.S. Navy Bellingshausen Sea Expedition in February 1960. Named by Advisory Committee on Antarctic Names (US-ACAN) for Thomas B. Mulroy, fuel engineer with Byrd Antarctic Expedition in 1928–30.

Maps
 Thurston Island – Jones Mountains. 1:500000 Antarctica Sketch Map. US Geological Survey, 1967.
 Antarctic Digital Database (ADD). Scale 1:250000 topographic map of Antarctica. Scientific Committee on Antarctic Research (SCAR). Since 1993, regularly upgraded and updated.

See also 
 List of Antarctic and sub-Antarctic islands

Islands of Ellsworth Land